Davis McCombs (born 1969) is an American poet. He attended Harvard University as an undergraduate, the University of Virginia as a Henry Hoyns Fellow, and Stanford University as a Wallace Stegner Fellow.  He is also the recipient of fellowships from the Ruth Lilly Poetry Foundation, the Kentucky Arts Council, and the National Endowment for the Arts. He is the Director of the Creative Writing Program, University of Arkansas.

McCombs' work appeared in The Best American Poetry 1996, The Missouri Review, Poetry, The Kenyon Review, Virginia Quarterly Review, Hayden's Ferry Review, and other magazines and journals.

McCombs grew up in Munfordville, Kentucky. From 1991 to 2001, he worked as a Park Ranger at Mammoth Cave National Park. He is married to the poet and photographer Carolyn Guinzio.

Awards
 2005 Larry Levis Editor's Prize by The Missouri Review for a sixteen-part sequence of poems called "Tobacco Mosaic"
 2005 Vachel Lindsay Poetry Award from Willow Springs for his poem "Rossetti in 1869"
 2005 Joy Bale Boone award from Wind magazine's for a poem called "Noodling."
 2005 Dorset Prize, chosen by Linda Gregerson
 2015 Porter Prize

Bibliography

Poetry collections

List of poems

References

External links
Interview Project #3: Davis McCombs , dislocate blog, November 22, 2006
Davis McCombs, Mixed Media, KET

Living people
American male poets
Harvard University alumni
University of Virginia alumni
Stanford University alumni
University of Arkansas faculty
Yale Younger Poets winners
People from Munfordville, Kentucky
The New Yorker people
1969 births
20th-century American poets
20th-century American male writers
21st-century American poets
21st-century American male writers
Poets from Kentucky